Stanislaus Bergheim (born 18 August 1984) is a German footballer who currently plays for FC Östringen.

References

External links

Stanislaus Bergheim at FuPa

1984 births
Living people
German footballers
Bonner SC players
1. FC Heidenheim players
Karlsruher SC II players
VfR Aalen players
1. FC Bruchsal players
2. Bundesliga players
3. Liga players
1. FC Normannia Gmünd players
Association football forwards